Mina Rokbi is a Moroccan former footballer who played as a defender. She has been a member of the Morocco women's national team.

Club career
Rokbi has played for FC Berrechid in Morocco.

International career
Rokbi capped for Morocco at senior level during the 2000 African Women's Championship.

Personal life
Rokbi is the sister of Saïd Rokbi.

See also
 List of Morocco women's international footballers

References

External links

Living people
Moroccan women's footballers
Women's association football defenders
Morocco women's international footballers
Year of birth missing (living people)